Eccles Coliseum is an 8,500-seat multi-purpose stadium in the western United States, on the campus of Southern Utah University   the home venue of the Southern Utah Thunderbirds football and track and field teams of the Western Athletic Conference (WAC).

The stadium also hosts the Utah Summer Games opening ceremonies and several events. The surface was natural grass until 2012.

See also
 Spencer Eccles
 List of NCAA Division I FCS football stadiums

References

External links
Southern Utah University Athletics – Eccles Coliseum
Utah Summer Games

College football venues
Sports venues in Utah
Multi-purpose stadiums in the United States
Sports venues completed in 1967
Southern Utah Thunderbirds football
1967 establishments in Utah
American football venues in Utah
College track and field venues in the United States
Athletics (track and field) venues in Utah